40 Too Long is a comedy album by American comedian Andrew Dice Clay, released in 1992. The album's name was taken from an argument he says he had with a Chinese clothing salesman who took his suit size (42 long) the wrong way and kept suggesting smaller sizes.  Unlike Clay's albums previously, he tends to side more with the women in this one on just about everything. (His siding with women was also the theme of his 1992 HBO special, For Ladies Only.)

Tracks 1–29 comprise a show he recorded at Governor's Comedy Club in Levittown, New York, on December 17 and 18, 1991. The last two tracks are original songs recorded and sung by Clay. (Both songs would later be incorporated into the beginning and the end, respectively, of For Ladies Only on HBO.)

All tracks on this album were produced by Rick Rubin, except for tracks 30 and 31 which were produced by Clay himself.

Track listing

 Dice Goes to the Mall
 Dice Talks to the Salesmen
 Dice Buys a Suit
 Dice on Disasters
 Dice on Nutrition
 Dice Just Says No Leno
 Dice on Redheads
 Dice on Lasting Relationships
 Dice the Advocate
 Dice Stops for Gas
 Dice on Reading Material
 Dice on Orgasms
 Dice's Checklist
 What a Mess
 Dice on Reheaded Men
 Dice Knows When to Say When
 Dice on Complaints
 Dice and Truckdrivers
 Dice Jerks Off
 Dice on Manners
 Dice vs. Pee-wee
 Dice at the Drive-Thru
 Dice Gets Creative in Bed
 Dice Learns to Mambo
 Dice on Bodybuilders
 Dice Does It Like Dis
 Dice Has Random Thoughts
 Dice Greeting Cards
 Dice Rewrites History
 Let Yourself Go
 You May Be Dancing with Me

References

External links
[ Allmusic]

Andrew Dice Clay albums
1992 live albums
American Recordings (record label) live albums
1990s comedy albums
Live comedy albums
Spoken word albums by American artists